Juan Francisco Barraza Flores (March 12, 1935 – December 17, 1997) was a Salvadoran football player and manager.

He is widely regarded one of the best Salvadoran footballers of all time.

Career
Born in the district of San Miguel as the son of Maria de la Cruz Barraza and Juan de Dios Flores, he attended Dr Antonio Rosales primary school.

Early years
Barraza began playing soccer in grade school and he joined C.D. Corona when he was eight years old.

Due to extreme hardship, he began playing with balls made out of rags.

During this very hard period, he discovered three secrets: One, that he was a lefty. Two, that soccer would give him a way to escape poverty. And three, that in life, he who does not give everything, does not get anything. "Cariota" always gave everything.

During his 15 years of soccer career, he played barefoot due to his lack of economic resources.

When he finally could afford soccer cleats, he had to train to get accustomed to them.

Professional career
He made his professional debut with Dragón on 15 February 1953 against El Palermo de Guatemala. A year later he won the Central American and Caribbean Games with El Salvador. In 1958 he joined Águila, with whom he won several league titles.

On 8 June 1969 he played his final international game against Honduras. He scored 13 goals for the national team in official games between 1959 and 1963. He scored 24 in 64 games including unofficial matches.

While playing for C.D. Corona, Dragón and finally Águila, where he earned them several titles, he was idolized by soccer fans because of his technical brilliance and pure skill.

Barraza was recognized for his excellence on the soccer fields by clubs from Brazil (in particular São Paulo) and Mexico who were so desperate to sign him up.

Retirement and death
He officially retired in 1970, and on December 17, 1997 Cariota died due to cardiac problems in Zacamil hospital in El Salvador. The municipal stadium in his native department of San Miguel, is named Estadio Juan Francisco "Cariota" Barraza in his honor.

Nickname 
The Cariota nickname was inherited through his parent, which is an extremely common custom in El Salvador.

Achievements

References

External links
Bio - CD Aguila 

1935 births
1997 deaths
People from San Miguel, El Salvador
Association football midfielders
Salvadoran footballers
El Salvador international footballers
C.D. Águila footballers
Salvadoran football managers
C.D. Águila managers
Municipal Limeño managers
C.D. FAS managers